Sidney Kirk Womack (October 2, 1896 – August 28, 1958), nicknamed "Tex", was an American professional baseball player. He appeared in one game in Major League Baseball for the 1926 Boston Braves as a catcher. He was born in Greensburg, Louisiana, and died in Jackson, Mississippi. He went to LSU and Mississippi State University.

External links

Major League Baseball catchers
Boston Braves players
Norfolk Tars players
Rochester Tribe players
Raleigh Capitals players
Portsmouth Truckers players
Rocky Mount Broncos players
Providence Rubes players
Wilson Bugs players
Quincy Indians players
Baseball players from Louisiana
1896 births
1958 deaths
People from Greensburg, Louisiana
Mississippi State Bulldogs baseball players
LSU Tigers baseball players